Chien-Chi Chang (born 1961) is a photographer and member of Magnum Photos.

Life and work
Chang was born in Taichung, Taiwan. He received an MS from Indiana University, Bloomington and a B.A. from Soochow University, Taipei.

He joined Magnum Photos in 1995 and was elected as a full member in 2001.

He lives in Taichung, Taiwan and Graz, Austria.

Chang focuses on the abstract concepts of alienation and connection. "The Chain", a collection of portraits made in a mental asylum in Taiwan, was shown at Venice Biennale (2001) and the São Paulo Art Biennial (2002). The nearly life-sized photographs of pairs of patients chained together resonate with Chang's look at the less visible bonds of marriage.

At São Paulo Art Biennial he was involved in the Thomann controversy.

Chang has treated marital ties in two books—I Do I Do I Do (2001), a collection of images depicting alienated grooms and brides in Taiwan, and in Double Happiness (2005), a depiction of the business of selling brides in Vietnam. The ties of family and of culture are also the themes of a project begun in 1992. For 21 years, Chang has photographed and videoed the bifurcated lives of Chinese immigrants in New York's Chinatown, along with those of their wives and families back home in Fujian. Still a work in progress, China Town was hung at the National Museum of Singapore in 2008 as part of a mid-career survey and at Venice Biennale (2011) as well as at International Center of Photography, New York (2012). Chang's investigation of the ties that bind one person to another draws on his own divided immigrant experience in the United States.

Awards
1998: Visa d'Or, Visa pour l'image, Perpignan, France
1998: Magazine Photographer of the Year, National Press Photographers Association, US
1998: Second prize, Daily Life singles, category, World Press Photo, Amsterdam
1999: First prize, Daily Life stories category, World Press Photo, Amsterdam
1999: W. Eugene Smith Grant, W. Eugene Smith Memorial Fund for Humanistic Photography, New York
2003: First place, Best of Photography Book (The Chain), Pictures of the Year International, US.

Books and selected monographs
Chang, Chien-Chi, The Chain, Photographs by Chien-Chi Chang. Taipei: Taipei Fine Arts Museum, 2001.
Chang, Chien-Chi, I Do I Do I Do. Taipei: Premier Foundation, 2001. .
Chang, Chien-Chi; Lai, Cheryl, The Chain. London: Trolley, 2002. .
Chang, Chien-Chi; Dowling, Claudia Glenn, Double Happiness. New York, NY: Aperture, 2005. .
Chang, Chien-Chi, I Grandi Fotografi: Magnum Photos: Chien-Chi Chang. Milan: Hachette Fascioli, 2008.
Chang, Chien-Chi, Les Grands Photographe de Magnum Photos: Chien-Chi Chang. Paris: Hachette, 2008.
Chang, Chien-Chi, Doubleness: photography of Chang Chien-Chi. Singapore: Editions Didier Millet and National Museum of Singapore, 2008. .

Video
2007: Empty Orchestra
2008: China Town I
2009: Escape from North Korea
2011: Burmese Days
2011: Bongo Fever
2011: China Town II
2013: AccessRH, Philippines
2014: Side Chain

Selected exhibitions
1999 The Alternative Museum, New York City
2001 Taipei Fine Arts Museum, Taipei, Taiwan
2001 Venice Biennale, Venice
2002 São Paulo Biennial, São Paulo
2004 Southeast Museum of Photography, Daytona Beach, Florida
2004 Ffotogallery, Cardiff
2006 Columbus Museum of Art, Columbus, Ohio
2008 National Museum of Singapore, Singapore
2009 National Taiwan Museum of Fine Arts, Taichung
2009 Venice Biennial, Venice
2011 Museum of Cultures / Museum der Kulturen, Basel
2012 The Cube Project Space, Taipei
2012 Chi-Wen Gallery, Taipei
2012 International Center of Photography, New York City
2013 Museum of Contemporary Arts, Taipei
2013 Museum of National Taipei University of Education, National Taipei University of Education, Taipei

Selected sound installations
2010 Many Voices of Immigrants, New York and Fuzhou, China
2013 Postcards from North Korea

See also
Taiwanese art

Sources
Chang, Chien-Chi. Biography and works at Magnum website
Chang, Chien-Chi. Asian journey: Taiwan: a vanished place. Time Asia, August 18–25, 2003.
 The Singular Approach: "Chien-Chi Chang's Contact Sheet Chronicle". Time, 2011
 Chang, Chien-Chi. China Town II (video). Museum der Kulturen, Magnum in Motion. Magnum Photos, 2012

References

External links

1961 births
Living people
American people of Taiwanese descent
Magnum photographers
Taiwanese photographers